Fenter is a surname. Notable people with the surname include:

Frank Fenter (1936–1983), South African music industry executive
Gray Fenter (born 1996), American baseball pitcher
Paul Fenter, American physicist

See also
Fender (surname)